Diospyros ferox is a tree in the family Ebenaceae. Inflorescences bear up to three flowers. The specific epithet  is from the Latin meaning "fierce", referring to the rusty bristles on twigs, leaves, flowers and fruits. Habitat is swamps and mixed dipterocarp forests from sea-level to  altitude. D. ferox is endemic to Borneo.

References

ferox
Plants described in 1933
Endemic flora of Borneo
Trees of Borneo